Mohammad Manik (born 4 March 1991) is a Bangladeshi first-class cricketer who plays for Barisal Division.

See also
 List of Barisal Division cricketers

References

External links
 

1991 births
Living people
Bangladeshi cricketers
Barisal Division cricketers
People from Barisal